Warren Martin (born July 20, 1976) is a Canadian former ice sledge hockey player. He won a silver medal with Team Canada at the 1998 Winter Paralympics. He also competed at the 2002 Winter Paralympics.

References

1976 births
Living people
Paralympic sledge hockey players of Canada
Canadian sledge hockey players
Paralympic silver medalists for Canada
Sportspeople from Montreal
Medalists at the 1998 Winter Paralympics
Paralympic medalists in sledge hockey
Ice sledge hockey players at the 1998 Winter Paralympics